This is a list of township-level divisions of the province of Shaanxi, People's Republic of China. After province, prefecture, and county-level divisions, township-level divisions constitute the formal fourth-level administrative divisions of the PRC.  This list is divided first into the prefecture-level then the county-level divisions. The ten prefecture-level divisions of Shaanxi are subdivided into 107 county-level divisions (28 districts, 3 county-level cities, and 76 counties). Those are in turn divided into 1785 township-level divisions: 917 towns, 680 townships, 98 ethnic townships, and 148 subdistricts.

Xi'an

Xi'an is divided into eleven districts and two counties.

Baqiao District 
Baqiao District has nine subdistricts.

Beilin District 
Beilin District has eight subdistricts.

Its subdistricts are Nanyuanmen Subdistrict, Baishulin Subdistrict, Changlefang Subdistrict, Dongguannan Street Subdistrict, Taiyi Road Subdistrict, Wenyi Road Subdistrict, Chang'an Road Subdistrict, and Zhangjiacun Subdistrict.

Chang'an District 
Chang'an District has twenty-five subdistricts.

Gaoling District 
Gaoling District has seven subdistricts.

Huyi District 
Huyi District has eight subdistricts and six towns.

Lantian County 
Lantian County has one subdistrict and eighteen towns.

Lianhu District 
Lianhu District has nine subdistricts.

Lianhu District has the following subdistricts.

Lintong District 
Lintong District has twenty-three subdistricts.

Weiyang District
Weiyang District has twelve subdistricts.

Xincheng District
Xincheng District has nine subdistricts.

Yanliang District 
Yanliang District has seven subdistricts.

Yanta District 
Yanta District has ten subdistricts.

Zhouzhi County
Zhouzhi County has one subdistrict and nineteen towns.

Tongchuan

Tongchuan is divided into three districts and one county.

Wangyi District 
Wangyi District has six subdistricts and one town.

Yaozhou District
Yaozhou District has six subdistricts and eight towns.

Yijun County 
Yijun County has one subdistrict, six towns, and one township.

Yintai District
Yintai District has four subdistricts and five towns.

Baoji

Baoji is divided into three districts and nine counties.

Chencang District 
Chencang District has three subdistricts and fifteen towns.

Feng County 
Feng County has nine towns.

Fengxiang County 
Fengxiang County has twelve towns.

Fufeng County 
Fufeng County has one subdistrict and seven towns.

Jintai District 
Jintai District has seven subdistricts and four towns.

Linyou County 
Linyou County has seven towns.

Long County 
Long County has ten towns.

Mei County 
Mei County has one subdistrict, and seven towns, and two other township-level divisions.

Its other township-level divisions are Shaanxi Mount Taibai Scenic Area and Honghegu Forest Park.

Qianyang County 
Qianyang County has seven towns.

Qishan County 
Qishan County has nine towns.

Taibai County 
Taibai County has seven towns.

Weibin District 
Weibin District has five subdistricts and five towns.

Xianyang

Xianyang is divided into three districts, nine counties, and two county-level cities.

Binzhou 
Binzhou has two subdistricts and eight towns.

Changwu County 
Changwu County has one subdistrict and seven towns.

Chunhua County 
Chunhua County has one subdistrict and seven towns.

Jingyang County 
Jingyang County has one subdistrict and twelve towns.

Liquan County 
Liquan County has one subdistrict and eleven towns.

Qian County 
Qian County has one subdistrict and fifteen towns.

Qindu District
Qindu District has twelve subdistricts.

Yangling District 
Yangling District has three subdistricts and two towns.

Weicheng (渭城区)

Subdistrict 街道	
Central Mountain Subdistrict (中山街道), Wenhuilu Subdistrict (文汇路街道), Xinxing Subdistrict (新兴街道), Weiyang Subdistrict (渭阳街道), Weicheng Subdistrict (渭城街道), Yaodian Subdistrict (窑店街道), Zhengyang Subdistrict (正阳街道), Zhouling Subdistrict (周陵街道), Dizhang Subdistrict (底张街道),

Town 镇	
Beitu (北杜镇)

Sanyuan (三原县)

Town镇	
Chengguan (城关镇), Anyue (安乐镇), Beixi (陂西镇), Duli (独李镇), Dacheng (大程镇), Xiyang (西阳镇), Luqiao (鲁桥镇), Lingqian (陵前镇), Xinxing (新兴镇), Cuo'e (嵯峨镇), Qu'an (渠岸镇)

Yongshou (永寿县)
Town镇
Jianjun (监军镇), Jiutou (店头镇), Changgning (常宁镇), Yijing (仪井镇), Ganjing (甘井镇), Mafang (马坊镇), Doujia (豆家镇), Yujiagong (御驾宫镇), Quji (渠子镇), Yongtai (永太镇), Yongping (永平镇)

Xunyi (旬邑县)
Town镇
Chengguan (城关镇), Tuqiao (土桥镇), Zhitian (职田镇), Zhanghong (张洪镇), Taicun (太村镇), Zhengjia (郑家镇), Jiapoutou (湫坡头镇), Dimiao (底庙镇), Basi (丈八寺镇), Malan (马栏镇), Qingyuan (清塬镇)

Wugong (武功县)
Town 镇
Puji (普集镇), Sufang (苏坊镇), Wugong (武功镇), Youfeng (游风镇), Zhenyuan (贞元镇), Changning (长宁镇), Xiaocun (小村镇), Dazhuang (大庄镇)

Xingping (兴平市)
Subdistrict 街道	

Dongcheng Subdistrict (东城街道), Western City Subdistrict (西城街道), Dianzhang Subdistrict (店张街道), Xiwu Subdistrict (西吴街道), Mawei Subdistrict (马嵬街道)

Town 镇
Zhaocun (赵村镇), Nanshi (南市镇), Zhuangtou (庄头镇), Nanwei (南位镇), Fuzhai (阜寨镇), Fengyi (丰仪镇), Tangfang (汤坊镇)

Weinan(渭南)

Linwei (临渭区)
 Subdistrict 街道	
Duqiao Subdistrict (杜桥街道), Renming Subdistrict (人民街道), Jiefang Subdistrict (解放街道), Xiangyang Subdistrict (向阳街道), Zhannan Subdistrict (站南街道), Shuangwang Subdistrict (双王街道), Liangtian Subdistrict (良田街道), Chongye Subdistrict (崇业路街道)

Town镇	
Qiaonan (桥南镇), Yangguo (阳郭镇), Gushi (故市镇), Xiagui (下邽镇), Sanzhang (三张镇)m Jiaoxie (交斜镇), Xinshi (辛市镇), Chongning (崇宁镇), Xiaoyi (孝义镇), Lingdian (吝店镇), Guandi (官底镇), Guanlu (官路镇), Fengyuan (丰原镇), Yancun (阎村镇), Longbei (龙背镇), Guandao (官道镇),

Hua (华州区)

Town 镇	
Huazhou (华州镇), Xinling (杏林镇), Sushui (赤水镇), Gaotang (高塘镇), Daming (大明镇), Guapo (瓜坡镇), Lianhuasi (莲花寺镇) Liuzhi (柳枝镇) Xiamiao (下庙镇), Jindui (金堆镇)

Tongguan (潼关县)
Town镇
Chengguan (城关镇), Qingdong (秦东镇), Taiyao (太要镇), Tongyu (桐峪镇), Daiziying (代字营镇)

Township乡
Anle (安乐乡)

Dali (大荔县)

Town 镇	
Chengguan (城关镇), Xuzhuang (许庄镇), Chaoyi (朝邑镇), Anren (安仁镇), Liangyi (两宜镇), Qiangbai (羌白镇), Guanchi (官池镇), Fengcun (冯村镇), Shaungquan (双泉镇), Gaoming (高明镇), Xiazhai (下寨镇), Weilin (韦林镇), Fanjia (范家镇), Sucun (苏村镇), Zhaodu (赵渡镇), Pingming (平民镇), Nianqiao (埝桥镇), Duanjia (段家镇)

Others which be similar township unit.(类似乡级单位)
State-owned Shaanxi Libei Enterprise Company (国营陕西荔北企业公司), State-owned Shaanxi Shayuan Enterprise Company (国营陕西沙苑企业公司),  State-owned Shaanxi Yellow River Enterprise Company (国营陕西黄河企业公司)

Heyang (合阳县)

Town 镇	
Chengguan (城关镇), Ganjing (甘井镇), Fang (坊镇), Qiachuan (洽川镇), Xinchi (新池镇), Heichi (黑池镇), Lujing (路井镇), Hejiazhuang (和家庄镇), Wangcun (王村镇), Tongjiazhuang (同家庄镇), Bailiang (百良镇), Jinyu (金峪镇)

Chengcheng

Subdistricts:
 Chengguan Sudistrict

Towns:
 Fengyuan, Wangzhuang , Yaotou, Zhaozhuang, Jiaodao, Siqian , Weizhuang, Anli, Zhuangtou

Pucheng

Subdistricts:
 Fengxian Subdistrict, Zijing Subdistrict

Towns:
 Hanjing, Sun , Xing, Dangmu, Gaoyang, Yongfeng,Jingyao, Sufang , Longyang, Luobin, Chenzhuang, Qiaoling, Yaoshan, Chunlin, Longchi

Baishui

Subdistricts:
 Chengguan Subdistrict

Towns:
 Yaohe, Dukang , Xigu, Lingao, Shiguan,Beiyuan, Leiya 

Fuping

Subdistricts:
 Chengguan Subdistrict

Towns:
 Zhuangli, Zhangqiao , Meiyuan, Liuqu, Dancun, Liugu,Laomiao, Xue , Daoxian, Caocun, Gongli, Meijiaping, Liuji , Qicun

Hancheng

Subdistricts:
 Xincheng Subdistrict, Jincheng Subdistrict (

Towns:
 Longmen, Sangshuping , Zhichuan, Xizhuang, Zhiyang, Banqiao

Huayin

Subdistricts:
 Taihualu Subdistrict,Yuemiao Subdistrict (

Towns:
 Mengyuan, Huaxi , Luofu, Huashan

Others:
 State-owned Shaanxi Huashan Enterprise Companyown

Yan'an 

Yan'an is divided into two districts, ten counties, and one county-level city.

Ansai District 
Ansai District has three subdistricts and eight towns.

Baota District
Baota District has five subdistricts, twelve towns, and one township.

Its subdistricts are Baotashan Subdistrict, Nanshi Subdistrict, Fenghuangshan Subdistrict, Zaoyuan Subdistrict, and Qiaogou Subdistrict.

Fu County 
Fu County has one subdistrict, six towns, and one township.

Ganquan County 
Ganquan County has one subdistrict, three towns, and two townships.

Huangling County 
Huangling County has one subdistrict and five towns.

Huanglong County 
Huanglong County has five towns and two townships.

Luochuan County 
Luochuan County has one subdistrict and eight towns.

Its sole subdistrict is Fengqi Subdistrict.

Wuqi County 
Wuqi County has one subdistrict and eight towns.

Yanchang County
Yanchang County has one subdistrict and seven towns.

Yanchuan County
Yanchuan County has one subdistrict and seven towns.

Yichuan County 
Yichuan County has one subdistrict, four towns, and two townships.

Zhidan County 
Zhidan County has one subdistrict and seven towns.

Its sole subdistrict is Bao'an Subdistrict.

Zichang
Zichang has one subdistrict and eight towns.

Its sole subdistrict is Wayaobao Subdistrict.

Hanzhong (汉中)

Hantai

Subdistricts:
 Beiguan Subdistrict, Dongdajie Subdistrict, Hanzhonglu Subdistrict, Zhongshanjie Subdistrict, Dongguan Subdistrict, Xinyuan Subdistrict, Qili Subdistrict, Longjiang Subdistrict

Towns:
 Pu, Wuxiang , Hedongdian, Zongying, Laojun, Hanwang, Xuwang

Nanzheng

Subdistricts:
 Hanshan Subdistrict, Zhongsuoying Subdistrict

Towns:
 Shengshui, Dahekan , Xieshui, Liangshan, Yangchun, Gaotai, Xinji, Lianshui, Huangguan, Qingshu , Hongmiao, Moujiaba, Fa, Xiangshui, Xiaonanhai, Beiba, Liping , Fucheng, Lianghe, Hujiaying

Chenggu

Subdistricts:
 Bowang Subdistrict, Lianhua Subdistrict

Towns:
 Longtou, Shaheying , Wenchuan, Liulin, Laozhuang, Juyuan, Yuangong, Shangyuanguan, Tianming, Erli , Wudu, Shuangxi, Xiaohe, Dongjiaying, Sanhe

Others:
 Shaanxi Aircraft Manufacturing Company

Yang

Subdistricts:
 Yangzhou Subdistrict, Zhifang Subdistrict, Qishi Subdistrict

Towns:
 Longting, Xiecun , Machang, Yishui, Moziqiao, Huangjiaying, Huang'an, Huangjin, Huaishuguan, Jinshui , Huayang, Maoping, Baliguan, Sangxi, Guandi

Xixiang

Subdistricts:
 Chengbei Subdistrict, Chengnan Subdistrict

Towns:
 Yanghe, Liushu , Shahe, Sidu, Sangyuan, Bailongtang, Xiakou, Yankou, Cha, Gaochuan , Lianghekou, Dahe, Luojiaba, Ziwu, Baimianxia

Mian

Subdistricts:
 Mianyang Subdistrict

Towns:
 Wuhou, Zhoujiashan , Tonggousi, Xinjiezi, Laodaosi, Baocheng, Jinquan, Dingjunshan, Wenquan, Yuandun , Fuchuan, Xinpu, Chadian, Zhenchuan, Chisuba, Zhangjiahe, Changgouhe 

Ningqiang

Subdistricts:
 Hanyuan Subdistrict, Gaozhaizi Subdistrict

Towns:
 Da'an, Daijiaba , Yangpingguan, Yanzibian, Guangping, Qingmuchuan, Maobahe, Tiesuoguan, Hujiaba, Bashan , Juting, Shujiaba, Taiyangling, Anlehe, Erlangba, Chanjiayan

Lueyang

Subdistricts:
 Xingzhou Subdistrict, Hengxianhe Subdistrict

Towns:
 Jieguanting, Xihuaiba , Lianghekou, Jinjiahe, Xujiaping, Baishuijiang, Xiakouyi, Matiwan, Lesuhe, Guo , Heihe, Baiquesi, Sendaiba, Wulongdong, Guanyin

Zhenba

Subdistricts:
 Jingyang Subdistrict

Towns:
 Yudu, Yanchang , Guanyin, Bamiao, Xinglong, Changling, Sanyuan, Jianchi, Nianzi, Xiaoyang , Qingshui, Chinan, Pingan, Yangjiahe, Bashan, Liba, Rencun, Dachi, Yongle

Liuba

Subdistricts:
 Zibai Subdistrict

Towns:
 Madao, Wuguanyi , Liuhou, Jiangkou, Yuhuangmiao, Huoshaodian, Qingqiaoyi

Foping

Subdistricts:
 Yuanjiazhuang Subdistrict

Towns:
 Chenjiaba, Daheba , Xichahe, Yueba, Changjiaoba, Shidunhe

Yulin (榆林)

Yuyang

Subdistricts:
 Gulou Subdistrict, Qingshanlu Subdistrict,Shangjunlu Subdistrict,Xinminglou Subdistrict,Tuofenglu Subdistrict,Chongwenlu Subdistrict, Hangyulu Subdistrict, Changchenglu Subdistrict,Jinshalu Subdistrict,Chaoyanglu Subdistrict,Shahelu Subdistrict,Mingzhulu Subdistrict

Towns:
 Yuhe, Shangyanwan , Zhenchuan, Mahuangliang, Niujialiang, Jinjitan, Mahe, Balasu , Yuhemao, Qingyun, Guta, Daheta, Xiaojihan , Qinhe

Townships:
 Mengjiawan Township, Xiaohaotu Township, Chaheze Township, Bulanghe Township, Hongshiqiao Township

Shenmu

Subdistricts:
 Binhexinqu Subdistrict, Xisha Subdistrict,Linzhou Subdistrict,Yingbinlu Subdistrict,Yongxing Subdistrict,Xigou Subdistrict

Towns:
 Gaojiabao, Dianta , Sunjiacha, Daliuta, Huashiya, Zhongji, Hejiachuan, Erlintu , Wan, Dabaodang, Ma, Langanbao, Shamao , Jinjie

Fugu

Towns:
 Fugu, Huangfu , Ha, Miaogoumen, Xinmin, Gushan, Qingshui, Dachanghan , Gucheng , Sandaogou, Laogaochuan, Wujiazhuang, Mugua, Tianjiazhai

Hengshan

Subdistricts:
 Chengguan Subdistrict, Huaiyuan Subdistrict, Xiazhou Subdistrict, Huairenlu Subdistrict, Chongdelu Subdistrict

Towns:
 Shiwan, Gao , Wu, Dangcha, Xiangshui, Boluo, Dianshi, Tawan , Zhaoshipan , Weijialou, Hancha, Baijie, Leilongwan

Jingbian

Subdistricts:
 Zhangjiapan Subdistrict

Towns:
 Dongkeng, Qingyangcha , Ningtiaoliang, Zhouhe, Hongdunjie, Yangqiaopan, Wangquze, Zhongshanjian , Yangmijian , Tianciwan, Xiaohe, Longzhou, Huanghaojie, Haizetan, Ximawan , Zhenjing

Dingbian

Subdistricts:
 Dingbian Subdistrict

Towns:
 Hequan, Hongliugou , Zhuanjing, Bainijing, Anbian, Duiziliang, Baiwanzi, Jiyuan , Yangjing , Xin'anbian, Zhangweixian, Fanxue, Yanchangbao, Haotan, Shidonggou , Fengdikeng

Townships:
 Youfangzhuang Township(), Xuezhuang Township()

Suide

Towns:
 Mingzhou, Xuejiamao , Cuijiawan, Dingxianchi, Zaolinping, Yihe, Ji, Xuejiahe , Sishilipu , Shijiawan, Tianzhuang, Zhongjiao, Mantangchuan, Zhangjiayun, Baijianai 

Mizhi

Subdistricts:
 Yinzhou Subdistrict

Towns:
 Tao, Long , Yangjiagou, Dujiashigou, Shajiadian, Yindou, Guoxingzhuang, Chengjiao 

Jia

Subdistricts:
 Jiazhou Subdistrict

Towns:
 Keng, Dian , Wu, Jinmingsi, Tong, Wangjiayun, Tangta, Zhujiagua , Xi, Zhuguanzhai, Liuguoju , Mutouyu

Wubu

Subdistricts:
 Songjiachuan Subdistrict

Towns:
 Xinjiagou, Guojiagou , Koujiayuan, Chashang, Zhangjiashan

Qingjian

Towns:
 Kuanzhou, Shizuiyi , Zhejiaping, Yujiahe, Gaojiecun, Lijiata, Dianzegou, Xiejiagou , Xialianlipu

Zizhou

Subdistricts:
 Binhexinqu Subdistrict

Towns:
 Hejiaji, Laojundian , Peijiawan, Miaojiaping, Sanchuankou, Matigou, Zhoujiadao, Dianshi , Zhuanmiao, Huainingwan, Macha

Townships:
 Tuoerxiang Township()

Ankang (安康)

Hanbin

Subdistricts:
 Laocheng Subdistrict, Xincheng Subdistrict,Jiangbei Subdistrict,Jianmin Subdistrict

Towns:
 Guanmiao, Zhangtan , Yinghu, Wuli, Hengkou, Jihe, Liushui, Dazhuyuan , Hongshan, Cigou, Dahe , Shenba, Shuanglong, Yeping, Zhongyuan, Xianhe, Zijing , Zaoyang, Guanjia, Shiti , Bahe, Niutie, Yanba, Tanba

Hanyin

Towns:
 Chengguan, Jianchi , Puxi, Pingliang, Shuangru, Tiefosi, Xuanwo, Hanyang , Shuanghekou, Guanyinhe

Shiquan

Towns:
 Chengguan, Raofeng , Lianghe, Yingfeng, Chihe, Houliu, Xihe, Yundou , Yunwushan, Zhongchi, Zengxi

Ningshan

Towns:
 Chengguan, Simude , Jiangkou, Guanghuojie, Longwang, Tongchewan, Jinchuan, Huangguan , Taishanmiao, Meizi, Xinchang

Ziyang

Towns:
 Chengguan, Haoping , Hanwang, Huangu, Xiangyang, Donghe, Huishui, Shuangqiao , Gaoqiao, Hongchun, Gaotan, Maoba, Wamiao , Maliu, Shuang'an, Dongmu, Jieling

Langao

Towns:
 Chengguan, Zuolong , Taohe, Guanyuan, Shimen, Minzhu, Dadaohe, Yanmen , Linhe, Siji, Mengshiling, Nangongshan

Pingli

Towns:
 Chengguan, Xinglong , Laoxian, Dagui, Sanyang, Luohe, Guangfo, Baxian , Chang'an, Zhengyang, Xihe

Zhenping

Towns:
 Chengguan, Cengjia , Niutoudian, Zhongbao, Shangzhu, Huaping, Shuping

Xunyang
 Towns:
 Chengguan, Zongxi , Guankou, Shuhe, Shuanghe, Xiaohe, Zhaowan, Maping, Ganxi, Bailiu, Luhe, Shenhe, Tongqianguan, Duanjiahe, Xianhe, Jinzhai, Tongmu, Gouyuan, Shimen, Hongjun, Renhekou

Baihe
 Towns:
 Chengguan, Zhongchang , Gouba, Kazi, Maoping, Songjia, Xiying, Cangshang, Lengshui, Shuangfeng, Mahu

Shangluo (商洛)

Shangzhou

Subdistricts
 Chengguan Subdistrict, Dazhaoyu Subdistrict,Chenyuan Subdistrict,Liuwan Subdistrict
 
Towns
 Yecun, Shahezi , Yangyuhe, Jinlingsi, Heishan, Yangxie, Majie, Muhuguan, Dajing, Yaoshi, Banqiao, Beikuanping, Sanchahe, Yancun

Others
 Erlongshan Reservoir(), Nanqin Reservoir(), Erlongshan State Forest Farm(), Shangdan Circulation Industrial Park(), Jinghe Industrial Park(), Jinghe Agricultural Demonstration Park(), University Park(), Shangluo Vocational and Technical College Township(), Silicon Fluoride Industrial Park

Luonan
1 subdistrict
Chengguan (城关街道)

9 towns
Maping (麻坪镇), Shimen (石门镇), Shipo (石坡镇), Xunjian (巡检镇), Si′er (寺耳镇), Lingkou (灵口镇), Sanyao (三要镇), Gucheng (古城镇), and Jingcun (景村镇)

Danfeng
1 subdistrict
Longjuzhai (龙驹寨街道)

9 townships
Dihua (棣花镇), Siping (寺坪镇), Tumen (土门镇), Zhulinguan (竹林关镇), Wuguan (武关镇), Tieyupu (铁峪铺镇), Luanzhuang (峦庄镇), Caichuan (蔡川镇), and Yuling (庾岭镇)

Shangnan
1 subdistrict
Chengguan (城关街道)

8 towns
Shiliping (十里坪镇), Qingyouhe (清油河镇), Shima (试马镇), Guofenglou (过风楼镇), Zhaochuan (赵川镇), Xianghe (湘河镇), Fushui (富水镇), and Qingshan (青山镇)

Shanyang
2 subdistricts
Chengguan (城关街道), and Shilipu (十里铺街道)

8 towns
Banyan (板岩镇), Sehepu (色河铺镇), Xiaohekou (小河口镇), Yangdi (杨地镇), Nankuanping (南宽坪镇), Manchuanguan (漫川关镇), Xizhaochuan (西照川镇), and Yinhua (银花镇)

Zhen'an
8 towns
Daren (达仁镇), Chaiping (柴坪镇),Qingtongguan (青铜关镇), Gaofeng (高峰镇), Miliang (米粮镇),Daping (大坪镇), Tiechang (铁厂镇), and Huilong (回龙镇)

2 ethnic towns
Hui Xikou (西口回族镇), and Hui Maoping (茅坪回族镇)

Zhashui
1 subdistrict
Qianyou (乾佑街道)

8 towns
Xingping (杏坪镇), Caoping (曹坪镇), Hongyansi (红岩寺镇), Fenghuang (凤凰镇), Xiaoling (小岭镇), Xialiang (下梁镇), Yingpan (营盘镇), and Wafangkou (瓦房口镇)

References

 
Shaanxi
Townships